Joseph Rosskopf (born September 5, 1989) is an American cyclist from Decatur, Georgia, who currently rides for UCI ProTeam .

Career
A professional since 2010, Rosskopf was named in the start list for the 2015 Vuelta a España and the start list for the 2016 Giro d'Italia. He won the Tour du Limousin in 2016, and became the second rider from the Americas, after Leonardo Duque, to win the race. 

Rosskopf was the winner of the United States National Time Trial Championships in 2017 and 2018. In July 2019, he was named in the startlist for the 2019 Tour de France.

In November 2020, Rosskopf signed a two-year contract with the  team, from the 2021 season.

Personal
Rosskopf graduated from Decatur High School.

Major results

2011
 2nd Overall Tour du Rwanda
1st Stage 4
2012
 4th Tour of the Battenkill
 9th Overall New Zealand Cycle Classic
2013
 1st  Overall Paris–Arras Tour
1st Stage 1
 1st Stage 4 (ITT) Tour de Beauce
 3rd Overall Flèche du Sud
 3rd Philadelphia International Championship
2014
 1st  Overall Redlands Bicycle Classic
1st Stage 5
 1st  Mountains classification Tour of Utah
 Pan American Road Championships
2nd  Road race
2nd  Time trial
 6th Overall USA Pro Cycling Challenge
2015
 1st Stage 3 (TTT) Critérium du Dauphiné
 1st Stage 1 (TTT) Vuelta a España
2016
 1st  Overall Tour du Limousin
1st Stage 1
 1st Stage 5 (TTT) Eneco Tour
 2nd  Team time trial, UCI Road World Championships
 6th Overall Tour of Utah
 10th Japan Cup
2017
 1st  Time trial, National Road Championships
 1st Stage 2 (TTT) Volta a Catalunya
 10th Overall Tour de Yorkshire
2018
 1st  Time trial, National Road Championships
2020
 1st  Mountains classification Tour Down Under
 3rd Overall Tour Poitou-Charentes en Nouvelle-Aquitaine
2021
 National Road Championships
1st  Road race
4th Time trial

Grand Tour general classification results timeline

References

External links

1989 births
Living people
American male cyclists
People from Decatur, Georgia
Cyclists from Georgia (U.S. state)